Frederick Rock (15 February 1840 - 7 November 1924) was a private in the United States Army who was awarded the Presidential Medal of Honor for gallantry during the American Civil War. He was awarded the medal on 10 August 1894 for actions performed at the Siege of Vicksburg on 22 May 1863.

Personal life 
Rock was born in Darmstadt in the Electorate of Hesse (modern day Hesse, Germany) on 15 February 1840. He emigrated to the United States in 1846, settling in Cleveland, Ohio. Before joining the Army in 1861, he had moved to Canada to farm. He married Mary A. Rock. After leaving the Army he worked in Cleveland as a laborer and watchman until 1875. He died in Tampa, Florida on 7 November 1924 and was buried in Woodlawn Cemetery in Tampa.

Military service 
Rock enlisted in the Army as a private on 15 August 1861 at Cleveland. He was assigned to Company A of the 37th Ohio Infantry. On 22 May 1863, during the Siege of Vicksburg by Union troops, Rock volunteered, along with 149 other men, to be a part of an extremely dangerous storming mission to build a bridge over a Confederate defensive moat east of Vicksburg. During the course of the assault, nearly 85 percent of the men were wounded or killed. For this action, Rock was awarded the Medal of Honor.

Rock's Medal of Honor citation reads:

After the attack, Rock left his regiment as a deserter and was carried by the Army from 28 April 1864 until his discharge at Camp Cleveland on 7 August 1865.

References 

1840 births
1924 deaths
German emigrants to the United States
United States Army Medal of Honor recipients
American Civil War recipients of the Medal of Honor